Lieutenant Paul Anthony Lynden Singer,  is a current officer in the Royal Australian Navy Reserve (RANR) and formally of the Royal Australian Navy (RAN). On 18 August 2018 he was appointed as the Official Secretary to the Governor-General of Australia under Sir Peter Cosgrove.

Naval career
Singer enlisted in the Royal Australian Navy in January 1996 as a principal warfare officer. He served on numerous vessels including as the warfare and boarding officer onboard HMAS Anzac (2001–2003) and as the executive officer of HMAS Launceston (2003–2005). From 2005–2006 he was the course implementation officer at HMAS Cerberus.

In May 2008 he transferred to active reserve as a Lieutenant.

Vice regal career
In 2008, Singer took up a position at Government House as the Manager Strategic Program and Operations. He managed the 2011 Royal Visit and CHOGM.

In 2015, he was appointed as the Director of Operations at government house and ran the day to day management of the house.

In 2016, he was appointed the Deputy Official Secretary and finally in 2018 as the Official Secretary.

As the Official Secretary he serves as the ex-officio Secretary of the Order of Australia and secretary of the Australian Bravery Decoration Council.

Honours and awards
He was appointed a Member of the Royal Victorian Order (MVO) in the 2016 New Year Honours.

On 19 February 2021 he was appointed an Officer of the Order of St John.

References

Living people
Australian public servants
Australian Members of the Royal Victorian Order
University of Sydney alumni
University of New South Wales alumni
Australian military personnel of the War in Afghanistan (2001–2021)
Australian military personnel of the Iraq War
Graduates of the Royal Australian Naval College
Royal Australian Navy officers
Year of birth missing (living people)